Rockers Revenge was a studio musical project, assembled by producer Arthur Baker in 1982. The group is most remembered by their 1982 post-disco hit "Walking on Sunshine", which peaked at number 1 on the US Dance Chart and number 4 in the UK.

Biography
The project was a collaboration of music producer Arthur Baker and featured reggae vocalist Donnie Calvin. Arthur primarily focused on the engineering and mixing while Donnie provided lead vocals. Tina B, who is married to Arthur Baker, contributed with backing vocals, writing and arrangement. There was also a backing vocalist called Dwight Hawkes. The group experimented with early elements of freestyle music.
    
The dance club mixes were created by Jellybean Benitez. The group's initial entry on the Hot Dance Club Play chart, "Walking on Sunshine" (an Eddy Grant composition, featuring vocals by Donnie Calvin) hit #1 on the U.S. dance chart in 1982. The track reached #4 in the UK Singles Chart in September 1982. Follow-ups "The Harder They Come" (1983) and "Living for the Weekend" (1984) also charted.

The project disbanded in 1984, due to the lack of chart success. Arthur moved to other projects and Donnie retired from his music career.

In 1988, a Rockers Revenge track ("Love Is on Our Side") appeared on Rough House Vol. 1, an early house music compilation album. In early 2005, "Walking on Sunshine" was re-released on the Gossip U.S. record label, featuring remixes by Hott 22 and Live Element. Another Rockers Revenge track called "Battle Cry" was featured in the film Beat Street and its soundtrack album.

Discography

Albums
 The Streetwise Sessions (2017)

Singles

See also
List of number-one dance hits (United States)
List of artists who reached number one on the US Dance chart

References

External links
Rockers Revenge Discography at Discogs.
Tina B at Discogs.

American freestyle musicians
American electro musicians
American boogie musicians
American electronic music groups
American house music groups